Rosa María Castillejo (born 28 January 1969) is a Spanish épée and foil fencer. She competed at the 1992 and 1996 Summer Olympics.

References

External links
 

1969 births
Living people
Spanish female foil fencers
Olympic fencers of Spain
Fencers at the 1992 Summer Olympics
Fencers at the 1996 Summer Olympics
Fencers from Madrid
Mediterranean Games silver medalists for Spain
Mediterranean Games medalists in fencing
Competitors at the 2001 Mediterranean Games
Spanish female épée fencers